Warhead is a 1977 American film directed by John O'Connor and produced by Buddy Ruskin. The film was originally shot in Israel in 1973 under the title Sabra Command.

The film is also known as Prisoner in the Middle, and Mission Overkill (in West Germany).  In Mexico, it was released as Amenaza Nuclear ("Nuclear Threat").

Plot summary 
Terrorists blow up a school bus in the Middle East, killing everyone on board except the military guard, Lt Liora who identifies the Palestinian Major Malouf as leading the operation.

An Israeli military operation with Liora along to identify Malouf sets out to find the terrorists. Meanwhile, a US Air Force Colonel named Stevens, who is a nuclear arms expert, is parachuted into the desert to disarm a nuclear bomb that has accidentally fallen out of an airplane flying over the area. He and the military operation eventually meet and clash over ideas as the operation decides to take possession of the nuke. Throughout the film, the operation pursues the terrorists and the nuke expert Stevens learns more about humanity through his relationship with Liora. In the end, all the terrorists and operation members die from various fights. Stevens alone survives and recalls his newfound discovery of the love of humanity. The nuke is left in the desert, presumably defused by another nuke expert.

Cast

Notes

External links 

1977 films
Israeli action drama films
1970s action adventure films
1970s English-language films
English-language Israeli films
Films about nuclear war and weapons
Films set in Israel
Films shot in Israel
Israeli–Palestinian conflict films
American action adventure films
1970s American films